Surf's Up is a 2007 American computer-animated mockumentary produced by Sony Pictures Animation. It was directed by Ash Brannon (in his feature directorial debut) and Chris Buck from a screenplay they co-wrote with Don Rhymer and Chris Jenkins, based on a story by Jenkins and Christian Darren. The film stars the voices of Shia LaBeouf, Jeff Bridges, Zooey Deschanel, Jon Heder, and James Woods. It is a parody of surfing documentaries, such as The Endless Summer and Riding Giants, with parts of the plot parodying North Shore. Real-life surfers Kelly Slater and Rob Machado have vignettes as their penguin surfer counterparts. To obtain the desired hand-held documentary feel, the film's animation team motion-captured a physical camera operator's moves.

Surf's Up was released in the United States on June 8, 2007 by Sony Pictures Releasing, and received generally positive reviews from critics, with praise for the animation and humor. The film grossed $152 million worldwide against a budget of $100 million. It was nominated for Best Animated Feature at the 80th Academy Awards, but lost to Pixar’s Ratatouille. A sequel, titled Surf's Up 2: WaveMania, was released direct-to-video in the United States on January 17, 2017, and theatrical in select countries.

Plot
In a mockumentary, northern rockhopper penguin Cody Maverick, living in Shiverpool, Antarctica, with his mother Edna and his older brother Glen, has yearned to be a professional surfer ever since meeting the famous surfer Big Z many years ago, so when a talent scout shorebird named Michael Abromowitz arrives to find entrants for the Big Z Memorial surfing contest on Pen-Gu Island, Cody jumps at the chance. En route to the contest, Cody befriends another entrant, Chicken Joe, a nice, but dim-witted rooster surfer from Sheboygan, Wisconsin.

The entrants arrive at Pen-Gu Island, where Cody meets and immediately falls in love with Lani Aliikai, a female gentoo penguin who is a lifeguard. He also meets the contest's arrogant champion, Tank "The Shredder" Evans, who has won the Big Z Memorial nine times since it was first held after Z's presumed death during a previous match ten years ago. Cody sees Tank vandalizing Big Z's memorial and immediately challenges him to a surfing duel. Tank wins the duel while Cody nearly drowns and is stung by a sea urchin named Ivan. Lani rescues him and takes him to her uncle, "Geek", to help Cody recover from his injuries. Cody wakes up, but cannot find the souvenir necklace given to him by Big Z. Geek then finds it in his hut.

While returning the necklace, Geek finds Cody sitting on a koa log and offers to help him make a surfboard. They attempt to take the log back to Geek's house, only to lose control of it and end up on a beach far away from the house. When Cody gets to the beach, he discovers a shack full of old trophies and surfboards, which used to belong to Big Z. After observing Geek walking sadly into the shack, he realizes that Geek is actually Big Z himself. Thrilled, Cody asks him to teach him how to surf. Z reluctantly agrees, but tells Cody he has to make his own board first. The attempt does not go well, however, as an impatient Cody refuses to listen to Z's advice and crafts a weak and unstable board that shatters upon hitting the water. Angry, Cody storms off and runs into Lani, who eventually persuades him to return. Cody spends the night working patiently on a new board.

Z compliments Cody on his new board, and Cody is eager to start training. Z instead has him do menial tasks seemingly unrelated to surfing. Finally, when Cody starts having fun, Z and Lani teach him how to surf the waves. Afterwards, Cody asks Z if he will come watch the contest, but Z refuses, revealing that he faked his death because he realized he couldn't compete with his then-new rival Tank, and that he had become too focused on winning. Not impressed that Z gave up, Cody throws the necklace Z gave him into the sea, meets up with Joe, and gets back to the contest just as it begins.

Tank makes it to the finals, as do Cody and Joe. In the semifinals, Tank battles with Cody, with Tank trying to throw him off his board, but Tank falls off his own board and loses. During the finals, however, Tank appears and tries to knock Joe off his board. Cody intervenes at the last minute, sending himself and Tank into an area of the beach known as the Boneyards, which consists of dangerously sharp rock outcroppings and has killed many surfers who have ventured there. Tank punches Cody off his board before crashing, and is rescued by Lani. Z, who had secretly been watching Cody's performance, rescues Cody from a gigantic wave and helps him get back to the beach safely.

Z and Cody find out that Joe won by default since Tank and Cody were disqualified. However, Cody accepts the loss, having decided he would rather just have fun instead. Z reveals himself to the spectators and invites all of them to surf at his beach, where he joins Cody in tube-riding. Cody finishes his interview with a reflection of the past events and then joins the rest of his friends in the water to celebrate and enjoy life.

Cast
 Shia LaBeouf as Cody Maverick, a 17-year old teenage rockhopper penguin who dreams of being a surfer.
 Jeff Bridges as Zeke "Big Z/Geek" Topanga, Cody's idol and a famous surfer emperor penguin.
 Zooey Deschanel as Lani Aliikai, a Gentoo penguin lifeguard and Cody's love interest.
 Jon Heder as Chicken Joe, a friendly, airheaded rooster from Wisconsin.
 Mario Cantone as Mikey Abromowitz, a talent scout shorebird.
 James Woods as Reggie Belafonte, a short-tempered sea otter, the competition promoter.
 Diedrich Bader as Tank "The Shredder" Evans, a king penguin and Cody's rival.
 Dana Belben as Edna Maverick, Cody's mother.
 Brian Posehn as Glen Maverick, Cody's older brother.
 Kelly Slater as the penguin version of himself
 Rob Machado as the penguin version of himself
 Ash Brannon as himself
 Chris Buck as himself
 Sal Masekela as himself
 Ryder Buck as Arnold
 Reese Elowe as Kate
 Jack P. Ranjo as Smudge
 Maddie Taylor as Ivan, a sea urchin

Music

Surf's Up: Music from the Motion Picture was released on June 5, 2007. The following 14 songs are on the Sony's official film soundtrack.

According to the film's end credits, the version of "Wipe Out" heard in the film is actually performed by the punk band The Queers. The official soundtrack includes this version under the pseudonym "Big Nose", presumably for marketing purposes. Two songs by Green Day, "Welcome to Paradise" (the version from the album “Dookie”) and "Holiday" in an instrumental version, are used for background music in the film. Neither song appears on the official soundtrack album. In the primary teaser trailer, the song "Get on Top" by the Red Hot Chili Peppers can be heard in the background. "Welcome to Paradise" was also used in the second trailer promoting Surf's Up, as well as "Three Little Birds" by Sean Paul featuring Ziggy Marley. The DVD and Blu-ray behind-the-scenes featurette entitled "Making Waves" features the song "The Water", performed by Venice. This also does not appear on the "Surf's Up" soundtrack, but can be found on Venice's "Garage Demos Part 2: Fast Stuff" CD.

Surf's Up: Original Ocean Picture Score was composed for the film by Mychael Danna and it was released on a limited edition (of a thousand units) 23-track CD.

Mandy Moore's "Top of the World" was featured in the film and included as one of the bonus tracks on the deluxe edition of the soundtrack album.

Release

Marketing

To promote the film's release, surfboard wax bearing the film's logo and a rendering of Cody was given out at the 2006 San Diego Comic-Con. It was attached to Open Season, which came out on September 29, 2006. On June 8, 2007, McDonald's issued eight Surf's Up toys in their Happy Meals for one month. In the Australian market, a few small plush characters of Cody, Lani, Chicken Joe, and Geek replace some of the toys in the US lineup. There was also a tie-in with the candy Air Heads which introduces a "New Wave" flavor (pineapple) and four collectible lenticular motion surf board shaped pieces. Build A Bear stores sold plush toys of the film's protagonist, Cody Maverick. Patrons could "build" their own Cody as well as dress him up in an array of surf-themed clothing and other accessories in Build A Bear workshops. They could also purchase Cody and accessories at the official site. Several plushes from Nanco intended for claw machines can also be found and purchased in varying sizes (from 6 inches to 11 inches to 17 inches). Characters available: Cody, Lani, Tank, Geek, Big Z, Chicken Joe, and Reggie Belefonte. A rare set of larger (Geek measures 15 inches) and higher quality plushes had been made available at the premiere's after party. Won either through available games, or given away with gift sets for attendees. Cody, Lani, Arnold and Geek were created and so far no plans for the dolls to be sold commercially have appeared. A series of children's 100 piece puzzles are available as well depicting various characters and setups. Five inch waterproof plush tub toys released by Jakks Pacific in minimal quantities to most major retailers. Five characters were produced, including Cody, Tank, Big Z, Arnold, & Chicken Joe. Each character has an attached washcloth/surfboard, but sport questionable likenesses (and in the case of Chicken Joe, entirely off model, bearing more of a resemblance to Mikey). Along with the release of the film, a companion Surf's Up video game was released by Ubisoft for all the current video gaming systems on the market. All versions of the game are the same with mild graphical differences, with only the Nintendo DS version changing the overall format.

Home media
Surf's Up was released on high-definition Blu-ray Disc, PSP UMD Video and DVD in the United States on October 9, 2007. The DVD and Blu-ray included two animated short films: The ChubbChubbs! and The ChubbChubbs Save Xmas, the latter of which premiered with this release.

Reception

Critical response
Surf's Up has a 79% approval rating on Rotten Tomatoes based on 147 reviews; the average rating is 6.67/10. The site's consensus reads: "Surf's Up is a laid-back, visually stunning animated movie that brings a fresh twist to some familiar conventions. Its witty mockumentary format is fun and inventive, and the CGI is breathtakingly realistic." Metacritic gave the film a score of 64 out of 100 based on 26 reviews. Audiences surveyed by CinemaScore gave the film a grade "A−" on scale of A+ to F.

Some reviews noted that in spite of it coming so soon after many films featuring penguins (March of the Penguins, Madagascar, and Happy Feet), Surf's Up was able to stand out on its own. Roger Ebert of the Chicago Sun-Times reviewed: "The originality of the documentary format coupled with the splendid CGI effects qualifies Surf's Up as not just another penguin movie." The Dallas Morning News critic Nancy Churnin agreed: "Sorry, cynics, Surf's Up is a charmer. And if the birds look somewhat familiar, they have something fresh to say about friendship and what winning is all about." While James Berardinelli of ReelViews said: "If you have to see one penguin movie, this is it", Kyle Smith of the New York Post had a different opinion: "Maybe the next penguin flick will do more justice to the subject." Roger Moore of Orlando Sentinel gave the film a positive score, noting that it was "beautifully animated, terrifically acted and edited in a way that hilariously mimics those Endless Summer surf documentaries." Conversely, Bill Muller, The Arizona Republic'''s critic, disliked almost everything: "From the nondescript voices to routine animation to an over-written story, this movie spends much of its time gasping for air."

Box office
The film opened at number four and grossed $5,804,772 at the box office on its opening day in North America. It grossed $17,640,249 in its opening weekend. The film grossed $58,867,694 in North America, and $93,138,019 in the other territories, making the total worldwide gross $152,005,713.

Accolades

Sequel
A direct-to-video sequel, titled Surf's Up 2: WaveMania'', was released on January 17, 2017. The film stars WWE superstars John Cena, Triple H, The Undertaker, Vince McMahon, and Paige.

References

External links

 
 Official DVD website
 
 
 
 
 
  - articles about the film production, mostly technical

2007 films
2007 comedy films
2007 computer-animated films
2000s American animated films
2000s children's comedy films
2000s children's animated films
2000s sports comedy films
2000s English-language films
American computer-animated films
American children's animated comedy films
American sports comedy films
American surfing films
American mockumentary films
Animated sports films
Annie Award winners
Animated films about penguins
Animated films about chickens
Films about otters
Animated films about birds
Films set in Antarctica
Animated films set on islands
Films set on beaches
Films directed by Chris Buck
Films directed by Ash Brannon
Films scored by Mychael Danna
Columbia Pictures films
Columbia Pictures animated films
Sony Pictures Animation films
Films using motion capture